Wanted Down Under is a BBC One morning television series, which has been running since 2007.  The programme shows families considering emigrating from the UK to either Australia or New Zealand.

Format
Considering a move to the other side of the world can create a massive dilemma for even the most close-knit families. For Mum perhaps constant sunshine and barbies on the beach is her lifelong dream, while for Dad and the kids it may mean leaving behind, not only everything, but everyone they know and love in the UK.
BBC One's Wanted Down Under helps families and couples from across the UK make one of the biggest decisions of their lives by giving them a week-long taste of life 'down under' before they decide whether or not to make the move.
Our intrepid families spend a trial week in an Australian or New Zealand city exploring property, work and lifestyle opportunities before checking out the true financial cost of living down under. 
After experiencing what a new life could offer, they are then shown often heart-breaking messages from their friends and families back home before voting once and for all whether they will stay ... or will they go?

Wanted Down Under Revisited
Is a retrospective program catching up with previous families to see if they have moved.

External links

Wanted Down Under Revisited

BBC reality television shows
2007 British television series debuts
2010s British television series
2020s British television series
Television series by BBC Studios